Bugor is a rural locality (a settlement) in Sasykolsky Selsoviet, Kharabalinsky District, Astrakhan Oblast, Russia. The population was 303 as of 2010. There are 9 streets.

Geography 
Bugor is located 35 km northwest of Kharabali (the district's administrative centre) by road. Sasykoli is the nearest rural locality.

References 

Rural localities in Kharabalinsky District